The Sultan Suleiman Mosque, is located in Mariupol, Donetsk Oblast, Ukraine. The mosque is named in honor of Suleiman the Magnificent and Roxelana.

History
The Sultan Suleiman Mosque and Islamic Cultural Center opened October 15, 2007. The architecture of the mosque was styled after the Süleymaniye Mosque in Istanbul. The mosque was financed by Turkish businessman Salih Cihan, who was born in Trabzon.

2022 Russian invasion of Ukraine

The mosque, which had been sheltering 80 civilians including Turkish citizens, was hit by Russian shelling on 12 March according to the Ukrainian Foreign Ministry. However the attack was denied by İsmail Hacıoğlu, head of the Suleiman the Magnificent Mosque Association, saying that the bombing was about 700 metres away.

Photos

See also
 Islam in Ukraine

References

2007 establishments in Ukraine
Mosques in Ukraine
Buildings and structures in Mariupol
Culture in Mariupol
Mosques completed in 2007
Buildings and structures destroyed during the 2022 Russian invasion of Ukraine